Hazleton is a city in Luzerne County, Pennsylvania, United States. The population was 29,963 at the 2020 census. Hazleton is the second largest city in Luzerne County. It was incorporated as a borough on January 5, 1857, and as a city on December 4, 1891.

History

Sugarloaf massacre

During the height of the American Revolution, in the summer of 1780, British sympathizers (known as Tories) began attacking the outposts of American revolutionaries located along the Susquehanna River in the Wyoming Valley. Because of reports of Tory activity in the region, Captain Daniel Klader and a platoon of 41 men from Northampton County were sent to investigate. They traveled north from the Lehigh Valley along a path known as "Warrior's Trail" (which is present-day Pennsylvania Route 93). This route connects the Lehigh River in Jim Thorpe (formerly known as Mauch Chunk) to the Susquehanna River in Berwick.

Captain Klader's men made it as far north as present-day Conyngham, when they were ambushed by Tory militiamen and members of the Seneca tribe. In all, 15 men were killed on September 11, 1780, in what is now known as the Sugarloaf Massacre.

The Moravians, a Christian denomination, had been using "Warrior's Trail" since the early 18th century after the Moravian missionary Nicolaus Ludwig Zinzendorf first used it to reach the Wyoming Valley. This particular stretch of "Warrior's Trail" had an abundance of hazel trees. Though the Moravians called the region "St. Anthony's Wilderness", it eventually became known as "Hazel Swamp", a name which had been used previously by the Native Americans. The Moravian missionaries were sent from their settlements in Bethlehem to the site of the Sugarloaf Massacre to bury the dead soldiers. Some Moravians decided to stay, and in 1782, they built a settlement (St. Johns) along the Nescopeck Creek, which is near the present-day intersection of Interstates 80 and 81.

Jacob Drumheller
In the late 18th and early 19th centuries, the Warrior's Trail was revamped and widened. It was renamed the Berwick Turnpike. Later, a road was built to connect Wilkes-Barre to McKeansburg. This road intersected with the Berwick Turnpike. An entrepreneur named Jacob Drumheller decided that this intersection was the perfect location for a rest stop, so in 1809, he built the first building in what would later be known as Hazleton. Though a few buildings and houses were erected nearby, the area remained a dense wilderness for nearly 20 years. At the time, the area offered little more than small-scale logging. Jacob Drumheller is buried at Conyngham Union Cemetery.

Discovery of coal

In 1818, anthracite coal deposits were discovered in nearby Beaver Meadows by prospectors Nathaniel Beach and Tench Coxe. This caught the attention of railroad developers in Philadelphia. A young engineer from New York named Ariovistus "Ario" Pardee was hired to survey the topography of Beaver Meadows and report the practicality of extending a railroad from the Lehigh Canal in Jim Thorpe to Beaver Meadows. Knowing that the area of Beaver Meadows was already controlled by Coxe and Beach, Pardee bought many acres of the land in present-day Hazleton. The investment proved to be lucrative. The land contained part of a massive anthracite coal field. Pardee is known as the founding father of Hazleton because of these contributions and initially laying out the patch town that eventually became Hazleton.

Pardee incorporated the Hazleton Coal Company in 1836, the same year the rail link to the Lehigh Valley market was on the brink of being completed. Hazleton Coal Company built the first school on Church Street, where Hazleton City Hall is now located. Pardee also built the first church in Hazleton, located at the intersection of Church and Broad Streets, and the first private school in Hazleton, located on the south side of Broad Street between Wyoming and Laurel Streets. Pardee died in 1892. The following year, in 1893, his son, Israel Platt Pardee, built a three-story, 19-room mansion in Hazleton; it was added to the National Register of Historic Places in 1984.

The anthracite coal industry attracted many immigrants for labor. The first wave, in the 1840s and 1850s, consisted mostly of German and Irish immigrants. The second wave, from the 1860s to the 1920s, consisted mostly of Italian, Polish, Russian, Lithuanian, Slovak, and Montenegrin immigrants. The coal mined in Hazleton helped establish the United States as a world industrial power, including fueling the massive blast furnaces at Bethlehem Steel.

Patch towns

Many small company towns, often referred to by locals as "patch towns" or "patches", surrounded Hazleton. They were built by coal companies to provide housing for the miners and their families. The following is a list of "patch towns" in and around Hazleton:
 Beaver Meadows, coal was discovered here
 Stockton, founded by John Stockton
 Jeansville, founded by James Milens
 Milnesville, founded by James Milens
 Tresckow, formerly known as Dutchtown
 Junedale, formerly known as Colraine
 Freeland, originally called Freehold (founded by Joseph Birkbeck in 1846)
 McAdoo, originally called Pleasant Hill, then Saylors Hill
 West Hazleton, founded by Conrad Horn
 Eckley, founded by Eckley B. Coxe
 Jeddo, named after a Japanese port to which coal was exported by the Hazleton Coal Company
 Hollywood, part of Hazleton, named before Hollywood, California
 Weatherly, a small borough outside of Hazleton
 Humboldt Village, a tiny village outside of Hazleton

Prosperity and tragedy

Hazleton was incorporated as a borough on January 5, 1857. “Hazelton” was intended to be the borough's name, but a clerk misspelled it during its incorporation, and the name "Hazleton" has been used ever since.  The borough's first fire company, the Pioneer Fire Company, was organized in 1867 by soldiers returning home from the American Civil War. Hazleton was incorporated as a city on December 4, 1891. At the time, the population was estimated to be around 14,000 people. In 1891, Hazleton became the third city in the United States to establish a citywide electric grid.

On September 10, 1897, the Lattimer Massacre occurred near Hazleton. It resulted in the deaths of 19 unarmed striking miners of the Lattimer mine. The miners, mostly of Polish, Slovak, Lithuanian, and German ethnicity, were shot and killed by a Luzerne County sheriff's posse. Scores more were wounded. The massacre was a turning point in the history of the United Mine Workers (UMW).

Hazleton was also struck by several mining disasters. Notable among these were the cave-ins at Sheppton, Jeanesville, and Stockton.

Mining disasters were not the only tragedies. In October 1888, a train crash killed 66 people near Mud Run when one passenger train crashed into the rear of another train on their way to White Haven. It was one of the worst train wrecks recorded in United States history.

20th and 21st centuries
 

Leading into the 20th century, Hazleton's population drastically changed. The "boom period" in population was 1885 to 1920. In 1860, there were only about one thousand people in Hazleton, but by 1880, there were nearly seven thousand people, which quickly became thirty-two thousand by 1920. The population peaked in 1940 at thirty-eight thousand.

With increased population came increased business, from downtown storefronts to large campuses like Penn State Hazleton.

Before World War II, anthracite coal flourished as a major provider of fuel for the nation. After the war, the demand for coal began to decline as natural gas and electricity became preferred power sources; coal became a less needed commodity. Also devastating to Hazleton's coal industry were two hurricanes (Diane and Hazel). They flooded the mines and brought an end to Hazleton's deep mining. Unemployment soared, reaching 25-30%. With the demise of deep mining, strip mining would be utilized as long as it was economically advantageous. A new era was about to be born: the era of business and industry.

Some industry preceded the demise of coal. The Duplan Silk Corporation opened in Hazleton in 1899, and became the world's largest silk mill. The garment industry thrived and was invested in by New York mobster Albert Anastasia.

In 1947, Autolite Corporation was looking to expand operations in the East and had been looking into Hazleton. Officials from Autolite came to the area and surveyed the land. In their report, they noted that Hazleton was a "mountain wilderness" with no major water route, rail route, trucking route, or airport. In response, several area leaders gathered to address these problems.

CAN-DO (Community Area New Development Organization) was formally organized in 1956 by founder Dr. Edgar L. Dessen. Their main goal was to raise money, through their "Dime A Week" campaign, in which area residents were encouraged to put a dime on their sidewalk each week to be collected by CAN-DO.

Because of CAN-DO's efforts, Hazleton was given the All-America City Award in 1964. Hazleton's economy is now based largely on manufacturing and shipping, facilitated by the relative closeness to Interstates 80 and 81. Five Pennsylvania highways also pass through the Hazleton area: Pennsylvania Route 309, Pennsylvania Route 93, Pennsylvania Route 924, Pennsylvania Route 424, and Pennsylvania Route 940.

An article published in December 2002 by U.S. News & World Report, "Letter from Pennsylvania: A town in need of a tomorrow", reported on Hazleton's shortcomings. It was criticized by local politicians and business leaders.

Immigration wave

The city experienced a demographic shift in the first years of the 21st century with the arrival of new immigrants: mostly from the Dominican Republic.

In 2006, Hazleton gained national attention as Republican Mayor Lou Barletta and council members passed the Illegal Immigration Relief Act. This ordinance was instituted to discourage hiring or renting to illegal immigrants. Initially, the ordinance levied an administrative fine of $100.00 per illegal immigrant rented to and a loss of permits for non-compliance.  Another act passed concurrently made English the official language of Hazleton.

Mayor Barletta estimated that "as many as half" of the estimated 10,000 Hispanics who were living in Hazleton left the city when the ordinance was passed. The issue was covered by the television program 60 Minutes in 2006 and the Fox News show The O'Reilly Factor in March 2007.

The ordinance was criticized as illegal and unconstitutional. A number of residents (landlords, business owners, lawful aliens defined as illegal under the act, and unlawful aliens) filed suit to strike down the law, claiming it violates the Supremacy Clause of the U.S. Constitution as well as the First and Fourteenth Amendments to the Constitution. After a trial and several appeals (including a remand from the Supreme Court), the Third Circuit found the ordinance invalid due to federal preemption.

As of 2015, nearly 40 percent of Hazleton's population was of Hispanic or Latino descent. In 2012, Amilcar Arroyo, a Hazleton Integration Project board member, estimated that 80% of Hazleton's Hispanics and Latinos were of Dominican origin, and that many of them had ancestry from San José de Ocoa. Hazleton has the highest percentage of Dominicans in Pennsylvania and the fourth highest in the nation. Many Dominicans had moved to Hazleton from portions of New York City, including The Bronx and Brooklyn) and parts of North Jersey, such as Newark and Paterson. Many of these migrants had families that were relatively large.

Many Hispanic and Latino businesses are on Wyoming Street, the linguistic landscape of which Spier and Ruano (2021) investigated in light of Barletta's aforementioned comments. In 2016, The Philadelphia Inquirer reported that the Wyoming Street corridor was revived from a moribund state. Also, in 2016, the Hispanic and Latino population became the majority, at 52%, with White residents, many descended from Irish, Italian, and German immigrants, comprising 44% of the population.

Geography

Hazleton is located at  (40.958834, −75.974546). The city is located in Pennsylvania's ridge and valley section (on a plateau named Spring Mountain). Hazleton's highest elevation is 1,886 feet above sea level, making it one of the highest incorporated cities east of the Mississippi River and the highest incorporated city in Pennsylvania. It straddles the divide between the Delaware and Susquehanna River watersheds.

Greater Hazleton
Hazleton and its surrounding communities are collectively known as Greater Hazleton. Greater Hazleton encompasses an area located within three counties: southern Luzerne County, northern Schuylkill County, and northern Carbon County. The population of Greater Hazleton was 77,187 at the 2010 census. Greater Hazleton includes the City of Hazleton; the boroughs of Beaver Meadows, Conyngham, Freeland, Jeddo, McAdoo, Weatherly, West Hazleton, White Haven; the townships of Black Creek, Butler, East Union, Kline, Foster, Hazle, Rush, Sugarloaf; and the towns, villages, or CDPs of Audenried, Coxes Villages, Drifton, Drums, Ebervale, Eckley, Fern Glen, Haddock, Harleigh, Harwood Mines, Hazle Brook, Highland, Hollywood, Hometown, Hudsondale, Humboldt Village, Humboldt Industrial Park, Japan, Jeansville, Junedale, Kelayres, Kis-Lyn, Lattimer, Milnesville, Nuremberg, Oneida, Pardeesville, Quakake,  St. Johns, Sandy Run, Still Creek, Stockton, Sybertsville, Ringtown, Sheppton, Tomhicken, Tresckow, Upper Lehigh, Weston, and Zion Grove.

Climate
According to the Köppen climate classification system, Hazleton has a warm-summer humid continental climate (Dfb). The average annual snowfall total is 47 inches. Hazleton averages 50 inches of rain annually. The hardiness zone is 6a.

Demographics

2010 census
As of the 2010 census, the racial makeup of the city was 69.4% White (59.0% non-Hispanic/Latino white), 4.0% Black or African American, 0.2% Native American, 0.8% Asian, and 22.0% from other races, and 3.4% were multiracial. Hispanic or Latino of any race were 37.3% of the population. Almost all of the population growth in Hazleton (from 2000 to 2010) consisted of Hispanics and Latinos.

There were 23,340 people, 9,798 households, with 6,162 of these being family households. The population density was 4,123.3 people per square mile (1583.75/km2). There were 9,409 housing units, at an average density of 1901.5 per square mile (713.1/km2).

There were 9,798 households, out of which 22.8% had children under the age of 18 living with them, 45.9% were married couples living together, 19.8% had a female householder with no husband present, and 17.1% were non-family households. 21.9% were made up of individuals, and 15.0% had someone living alone who was 65 years of age or older. The average household size was 2.54 and the average family size was 3.19.

In the city, the population was spread out, with 25.3% under the age of 18, 10.3% from 18 to 24, 24.1% from 25 to 44, 24.2% from 45 to 64, and 16.1% who were 65 years of age or older. The median age was 35 years. For every 100 females, there were 83.6 males. For every 100 females age 18 and over, there were 90.4 males.

Economy
All of Hazleton's major mining and garment industries have disappeared over the past 50 years. Through the efforts of CANDO and a practical highway infrastructure, Hazle Township's Humboldt Industrial Park has become home to many industries. Coca-Cola, American Eagle Outfitters, Hershey, Office Max, Simmons Bedding Company, Michaels, Network Solutions, AutoZone, General Mills, Steelcase, WEIR Minerals, EB Brands and Amazon.com  are just some of the large companies with distribution, manufacturing, or logistic operations in Hazleton.

6.7% of residents had an income below the poverty level as compared to a statewide average of 12.5% in 2010.

Arts and culture

Regional parks and outdoor entertainment
 Altmiller Playground
 Eagle Rock Resort (private)
 Edgewood In The Pines Golf Course
 Greater Hazleton Rails To Trails
 Hazle Township Community Park & Soccer Fields
 Hickory Run State Park
 Lehigh Gorge State Park
 Memorial Park
 Paragon Off-Road Adventure Park (Closed 2007)
 Valley Country Club Golf Course (private)
 Whitewater Challenge (in Jim Thorpe)

Organizations and historic locations
Hazleton's modest skyline is remarkable for a city its size. Almost unaffected by examples of modern architecture, it provides an interesting window on American urbanism prior to World War II.
 Altamont Hotel
 Duplan Silk Building
 Eckley Miners' Village
 St. Gabriel's Catholic Parish Complex
 Hazleton Cemetery (the Vine Street Cemetery)
 Hazleton National Bank
 Israel Platt Pardee Mansion
 Markle Banking & Trust Company Building
 Lattimer Massacre, which began at State Route 924 near Harwood
 MPB Community Players
 Nuremberg Community Players
 Pennsylvania Theatre of Performing Arts (PTPA)
 Saint Joseph Slovak Roman Catholic Church
 Traders Bank Building

Annual festivals
Hazleton's annual street festival, Funfest, is celebrated usually during the second weekend of September. The festival includes a craft show, a car show, entertainment from local bands, and many games of chance. The Funfest parade is held on Sunday (during the Funfest weekend). Valley Day is celebrated in Conyngham during the first weekend of August. Many church festivals are celebrated to preserve the Italian heritage of Hazleton. This would include the Festival of the Madonna del Monte at Most Precious Blood Roman Catholic Church (in Hazleton).

Sports
Hazleton was a long-time home to minor league baseball. On April 14, 1934, the Philadelphia Phillies entered into an affiliation agreement with the New York–Penn League Hazleton Mountaineers. This was the first ever minor league affiliation for the Phillies. The last minor-league club to play in Hazleton was the Hazleton Dodgers in 1950, a Brooklyn Dodgers farm-club which played in the Class D North Atlantic League.

Media

Newspapers
 Standard-Speaker
 Latino News
 El Mensajero (serves as one of the Hispanic/Latino newspapers in Hazleton)

Radio
  WAZL-AM 1490

Television
 Sam-Son Productions (public-access television)
 WYLN-35

Education

 

The first school was built in the 1830s by the Hazleton Coal Company. It was a private elementary school at the corner of Church and Green Streets (the present-day site of Hazleton City Hall). Hazleton High School (the first high school) was built in 1875 at the corner of Pine and Hemlock Streets (the present-day site of the Pine Street Playground). Bishop Hafey High School was Hazleton's only Roman Catholic High School; it was owned by the Diocese of Scranton. It was opened in 1971 and closed in 2007 (by the order of former Bishop Joseph F. Martino).

Hazleton Area School District
The Hazleton Area School District (HASD) operates public schools serving the city limits. According to 2000 federal census data, it served a resident population of 70,042. By 2010, the district's population increased to 72,862 people. The educational attainment levels for the Hazleton Area School District population (25 years old and over) were 83.8% high school graduates and 15.2% college graduates. As of 2015, there were 10,871 pupils in Hazleton Area School District. There are three schools in Hazleton (operated by the HASD):
Hazleton Elementary/Middle School
Heights-Terrace Elementary/Middle School
Arthur Street Elementary School

All district students are zoned to Hazleton Area High School in Hazle Township.

Private schools
 Holy Family Academy
 Immanuel Christian School
 MMI Preparatory School

Colleges and universities
 Lackawanna College
 Luzerne County Community College
 Penn State Hazleton

Other
 The Greater Hazleton Historical Society and Museum
 Hazleton Area Public Library

Infrastructure

Public transportation
Public transportation is provided by the Hazleton Public Transit, which operates nine routes throughout the city and neighboring communities.

Major highways
There are three nearby Interstates:
 

There are five major inbound roadways: 
 (Broad Street)
 (Church Street)
 (Arthur Gardner Parkway) 
 (CAN-DO Expressway, Broad Street (Conjuncture with PA-93), 15th Street, Terminus at PA-309)
 (Fisher's Avenue, Terminus at PA-309 and 22nd Street)

Rail
Norfolk Southern Railway and Reading Blue Mountain and Northern Railroad are used for commercial rail traffic.

Air transit
Wilkes-Barre/Scranton International Airport (in Pittston Township)
Hazleton Municipal Airport (two miles northwest of Hazleton)

Notable people

 Lou Barletta, former mayor of Hazleton and former U.S. congressman
 Edward Bonin, former mayor of Hazleton and former U.S. congressman
 Frank Borzage, Academy Award-winning film director
 Hubie Brown, basketball coach and television analyst
 Russ Canzler, former professional baseball player
 Flick Colby, former choreographer
 John Dapcevich, former mayor of Juneau, Alaska
 Carl Duser, former professional baseball player
 Todd A. Eachus, former Pennsylvania State Representative
 Dan Flood, former U.S. congressman
 Thomas R. Kline, lawyer
 Sarah Knauss, longest documented living American, world's third longest living documented person (until age 119)
 Norm Larker (Beaver Meadows), player for the LA Dodgers
 Charles Lemmond, former state senator
 Sherrie Levine, photographer and appropriation artist
 H. Craig Lewis, former state senator
 Joe Maddon, Major League Baseball manager
 Don Malkames, cinematographer
 Tom Matchick, MLB player
 David Micahnik (born 1938), Olympic fencer
 Judith Nathan, wife of former New York City Mayor Rudolph Giuliani
 Jack Palance (Hazle Township), Oscar-winning actor
 Eddie Rambeau, singer, songwriter, and actor.
 Andrew Soltis, chess grandmaster
 John Thomas Sweeney, murderer of Dominique Dunne
 Mike Tresh, MLB catcher
 Bob Tucker, NFL tight end with the New York Giants
 June Winters, actress and singer

Sister cities

Hazleton's sister cities are:
 Donegal, Limerick, Letterkenny - Ireland
 Corleone, Cilento, Bellagio, Positano, Capri, Campania - Italy
 Ayn al-Tamr - Iraq

References

External links

 
Cities in Luzerne County, Pennsylvania
Cities in Pennsylvania
Coal towns in Pennsylvania
Municipalities of the Anthracite Coal Region of Pennsylvania
Populated places established in 1780